The Life of General Villa (1914) is a silent biographical action–drama film starring Pancho Villa as himself, shot on location during a civil war. The film incorporated both staged scenes and authentic live footage from real battles during the Mexican Revolution, around which the plot of the film revolves. The film was produced by D. W. Griffith and featured future director Raoul Walsh as the younger version of Villa.

Currently the film is presumably lost, with only unedited fragments and publicity stills known to exist.

The making of the film and associated events were dramatized in the film And Starring Pancho Villa as Himself (2003) with Antonio Banderas starring as Villa and Kyle Chandler playing Walsh.

Production

Pancho Villa's reason for starring in the movie was financial as he needed funds to fight the Mexican Revolution. He eventually signed a contract with the Mutual Film Corporation where he received a $25,000 advance and was promised 50% of the profits from the film for agreeing to let the company shoot his battles in daylight, and for re-enacting them if more footage was needed. (The contract resides in a museum in Mexico City at the Archivo Federico Gonzalez Garza, folio 3057.)

Raoul Walsh wrote extensively about the experience in his autobiography Each Man in His Time, describing Villa's charisma as well as noting that peasants would knock the teeth out of corpses with rocks in the wake of firing squads in order to harvest the gold fillings, which was captured on film and had the projectionists vomiting in the screening room back in Los Angeles.

The following year, Walsh played John Wilkes Booth in Griffith's epic The Birth of a Nation and directed the first gangster movie, Regeneration, on location in the Bowery on the Lower East Side of Manhattan.

Cast
 Pancho Villa as himself
 Raoul Walsh as Villa as a young man
 Teddy Sampson as Villa's Sister
 Irene Hunt as Villa's Sister
 Walter Long as Federal Officer
 W. E. Lawrence as Federal Officer
 Juano Hernández as Revolutionary Soldier

See also
 List of lost films

External links

1914 films
1910s war drama films
American action drama films
American war drama films
American silent feature films
American biographical drama films
American black-and-white films
Films about Pancho Villa
Films shot in Mexico
Mexican Revolution films
Lost American films
Mutual Film films
1914 lost films
1910s action drama films
1910s biographical drama films
Lost action drama films
1914 drama films
1910s American films
Silent American drama films
Silent adventure films
Silent war drama films
1910s English-language films